Acianthera pernambucensis is a species of orchid plant native to Brazil.

References 

pernambucensis
Flora of Brazil